The Concord Museum is a museum of local history located at 53 Cambridge Turnpike, Concord, Massachusetts, United States, and best known for its collection of artifacts from authors Ralph Waldo Emerson and Henry David Thoreau. Updated hours are available on their website (concordmuseum.org), and an admission fee is charged.

Overview

Founded in 1886, the museum's collections started around 1850. Few collections of early Americana are as old or well documented. Its most notable items and collections include:

 The "one if by land, and two if by sea" lantern, said to be hung in the Old North Church in 1775, and immortalized in the 1860 poem "Paul Revere's Ride" by Henry Wadsworth Longfellow.
 American Revolution artifacts including powder horns, muskets, cannonballs, and fifes
 A recreation of Ralph Waldo Emerson's study, including his books and furnishings, arranged as at his death in 1882.
 The world's largest collection of Thoreau possessions (over 250 objects), including the bed, desk, and chair from his cabin at Walden Pond, where Thoreau wrote his 1849 book A Week on the Concord and Merrimack Rivers and gained the inspiration for his 1854 book Walden.

The museum's collection of 17th, 18th, and 19th-century decorative arts includes furniture, clocks, looking glasses, textiles, ceramics, and metalware. Most displayed objects are arranged in the following period settings:

 Early 18th-Century Chamber – a principal room circa 1720 in the house of a prominent Concord citizen.
 Mid 18th-Century Chamber – with tea table and ceramics, silver, etc., as well as period furnishings including high chest, dressing table, and desk.
 Early 19th-Century Chamber – typical period furnishings.
 19th-Century Parlor, Set for Dining – a dining room furnished to Neoclassical style.

Other museum collections include Native American stone tools, Puritan household goods, lyceum and cattle show posters, clocks and other machinery manufactured in Concord, and works by sculptor Daniel Chester French.

External links 
 Concord Museum

Museums in Concord, Massachusetts
History museums in Massachusetts
Institutions accredited by the American Alliance of Museums